The Slave Lodge is a South African social history museum located in Cape Town. It has been on its present site in the Company's Garden.

References

External links
 
 

Museums in Cape Town
Slavery museums